Magomedbek Aliyev (born 14 May 1967) is a Russian judoka. He competed in the men's lightweight event at the 1992 Summer Olympics, representing the Unified Team.

References

External links
 

1967 births
Living people
Russian male judoka
Olympic judoka of the Unified Team
Judoka at the 1992 Summer Olympics